Tepidimonas is a genus of Gram-negative, strictly aerobic, oxidase- and catalase-positive, rod-shaped, slightly thermophilic bacteria from the family Comamonadaceae.

References

Comamonadaceae
Bacteria genera